In the Philippines, Cadet is a rank held by candidate officer during the training to become commissioned officers in their preferred branch of military service.

Abbreviation 

 OCS – Officer Candidate School
 AFPOCS – Armed Forces of the Philippines Officer Candidate School
 PAOCS – Philippine Army Officer Candidate School
 PNOCS – Philippine Navy Officer Candidate School
 PAFOCS – Philippine Air Force Officer Candidate School
 PMCOCS – Philippine Marine Corps Officer Candidate School
 PCGOBETC – Philippine Coast Guard Officers Basic Education and Training Center
 RESCOM – Reserve Command, Philippine Army
 NRC – Naval Reserve Command
 AIR RESCOM – Air Force Reserve Command
 PMA – Philippine Military Academy
 PMMA – Philippine Merchant Marine Academy
 PNPA – Philippine National Police Academy
 MAAP – Maritime Academy of Asia and the Pacific
 ACP – Aerospace Cadets of the Philippines
 PAOCC/OCC – Philippine Army Officer Candidate Course
 NOCC – Naval Officer Candidate Course
 PAFOCC – Philippine Air Force Officer Candidate Course
 NOCC (M) – Philippine Marine Corps Naval Officer Candidate Course
 CGOC – Coast Guard Officers; Course
 PAOPC/OPC – Philippine Army Officer Preparatory Course
 POTC – Probationary Officer Training Course
 PAFCAT – Philippine Air Force Citizenship Advancement Training
 ROTC – Reserve Officers; Training Corps
 P2LT – Probationary 2nd Lieutenant
 PENS – Probationary Ensign
 CDT 1CL – Cadet 1st Class
 CDT 2CL – Cadet 2nd Class
 CDT 3CL – Cadet 3rd Class
 CDT 4CL – Cadet 4th Class

Cadet vs. Officer Candidate 
The words cadet and officer candidate are synonymous in referring the rank below second lieutenant. In the Philippines, officer candidates are referred to RESCOM, AFPOCS and PCGOBETC students who had baccalaureate degree, foreign service academies and reserve officer pools undergoing 4 months to 1 year of rigorous military training. On the other hand, cadets are referred to students of military schools undergoing 4 years of military training while completing their college degree.

References 

Military ranks of the Philippines